Sega Sports' World Series Baseball, or simply World Series Baseball, is a sports game developed by BlueSky Software and published by Sega for the Genesis/Mega Drive and Game Gear. It is the first game in the series and was originally released in 1994. A version for the Sega 32X, World Series Baseball starring Deion Sanders, would follow in 1995.

The game was a major advancement in Sega baseball games in that it included licensed MLB players and teams (the first baseball video game to have both such licenses [previous baseball video games only had one license]; they are based on the rosters for the 1994 MLB season), and relatively accurate gameplay.

The series concluded with World Series Baseball 2K3 on the PlayStation 2 and the Xbox. After that, Sega contracted with 2K Games to take over their sports game contracts and the line continued as the Major League Baseball 2K franchise.

San Diego Padres broadcaster Jerry Coleman provides the play-by-play for the game.

The first World Series Baseball officially licensed by the MLB was released by Mattel Electronics for the Intellivision in 1983 with a stunning 3D graphic.

Reception
GamePro gave the Genesis version a rave review, calling it "arguably the best baseball cart ever." They praised the use of real life teams, players, and stadiums, the accurate graphical recreation of the stadiums, the catcher's-eye view of the action, and the generally impressive graphics.

Notes

References

1994 video games
BlueSky Software games
World Series Baseball video games
Sega video games
Sega Genesis games
Game Gear games
Video games developed in the United States
Video games scored by Sam Powell